Estonian Bowling Association (abbreviation EBA) is one of the sport governing bodies in Estonia which deals with bowling (tenpin bowling and ninepin bowling).

EBA is established on 28 November 1991. EBA is a member of International Bowling Federation (IBF).

References

External links
 

Sports governing bodies in Estonia